Julius Caesar's planned invasion of the Parthian Empire was to begin in 44 BC, but the Roman dictator's assassination that year prevented the invasion from taking place.

The campaign was to start with the pacification of Dacia, followed by an invasion of the Parthian Empire.

Plutarch also claims that once Parthia had been subdued, the army was to continue to Scythia, then Germania and finally back to Rome. Those grander plans are found only in Plutarch's Parallel Lives, and their authenticity is questioned by most scholars.

Preparation and invasion plans
There is evidence that Caesar had begun practical preparation for the campaign some time before late 45 BC. By 44 BC Caesar had begun a mass mobilization, sixteen legions (c.60,000 men) and 10,000 cavalry were being gathered for the invasion. These would be supported by auxiliary cavalry and light armed infantry. 

Six of the legions had already been sent to Macedonia to train, along with a large sum of gold for the expedition. Octavius was sent to Apollonia (within modern Albania), ostensibly as a student, to remain in contact with the army. As Caesar planned to be away for some time, he reordered the senate and ensured that all magistrates, consuls and tribunes would be appointed by him during his absence. Caesar intended to leave Rome to start the campaign on 18 March; however, three days prior to his departure he was assassinated. 

The expedition was planned to take three years. It was to begin with a punitive attack on Dacia under King Burebista, who had been threatening Macedonia's northern border. It has been suggested by Christopher Pelling that Dacia, not Parthia, was going to be the expedition's main target.

After Dacia the army was then to invade Parthia from Armenia. The ancient sources diverge. Suetonius states that Caesar wished to proceed cautiously and would not fully engage the Parthian army unless he had determined their full strength. Although he implies that Caesar's goal was an expansion of the empire, not just its stabilization, Plutarch describes a bolder campaign by writing that once Parthia had been subdued, the army would move through the Caucasus, attack Scythia and return to Italy after it had conquered Germania. Plutarch also states that the construction of a canal through the isthmus of Corinth for which Anienus had been placed in charge, was to occur during the campaign.

Plutarch's reliability 
Plutarch's Parallel Lives was written with the intention of finding correlations between the lives of famous Romans and Greeks; for example, Caesar was paired with Alexander the Great. Buszard's reading of Parallel Lives also interprets Plutarch as trying to use Caesar's future plans as a case study in the error of unbridled ambition. 

Some academics have theorised that Caesar's pairing with Alexander and Trajan's invasion of Parthia, which was around the time of Plutarch's writing, led to exaggerations in the presented invasion plan. The deployment of the army to Macedonia near the Dacian frontier and the lack of military preparation in Syria have also been used to lend support for that hypothesis. Malitz acknowledges that the Scythia and Germania plans appear to be unrealistic but believes that they were credible with the geographic knowledge of the time.

Motivation for invasion 
The public excuse for the expedition was that less than ten years earlier, in 53 BC, an invasion of the Parthian Empire had been attempted by Roman Consul Marcus Licinius Crassus and ended in failure and his death at the Battle of Carrhae. To many Romans, that required revenge. Also, Parthia had taken Pompey's side in the recent civil war against Caesar.

As the Roman Republic in 45 BC was still politically divided after the civil war, Marcus Cicero tried to lobby Caesar to postpone the Parthian invasion and to solve domestic problems instead. Following a similar line of thought in June that year, Caesar temporarily wavered in his intention to leave with the expedition. However, Caesar finally decided to leave Rome and to join the army in Macedonia.

A number of motivations have been proposed to explain his decision to continue his military career. After a victorious campaign he would have, as Plutarch wrote, "completed this circuit of his empire, which would then be bounded on all sides by the ocean" and returned home with his lifelong dictatorship secured. It has also been proposed that Caesar knew of the threats against him and felt that leaving Rome and being in the company of a loyal army would be safer both personally and politically. Caesar may have also wished to heal the rift from the civil war or to distract from it by reminding the populace of Rome of the threat of a neighbouring empire.

Aftermath 
In order to support a royal title for Caesar, a rumour was spread before the planned invasion. It alleged that it had been prophesied that only a Roman king could defeat Parthia. As Caesar's greatest internal opposition came from those that believed he wanted royal power, that strengthened the conspiracy against him.

It has also been proposed that Caesar's opposition would be fearful of him returning victorious from his campaign since he would be more popular than ever.

The assassination occurred on 15 March 44 BC on the day that the senate was to debate granting Caesar the title of king for the war with Parthia. However, some of the aspects of Caesar's planned kingship may have been invented after the assassination to justify the act. The relationship between the planned Parthian war and his death, if any, is unknown.  

After Caesar's death, Mark Antony successfully vied for control of the legions from the planned invasion, which were still stationed in Macedonia, and he temporarily took control of that province to do so. From 40 to 33 BC, Rome and particularly Antony would wage an unsuccessful war against Parthia. He used Caesar's proposed invasion plan, of attacking through Armenia, where it was felt that the support of the local king could be relied on.

In Dacia, Burebista died the same year as Caesar, which led to the dissolution of his kingdom.

Footnotes

References

Sources

Ancient
Appian, The Civil Wars
Cassius Dio, Roman History
Nicolaus of Damascus, Life of Augustus
Plutarch, Parallel Lives.
Suetonius, The Twelve Caesars.

Modern

External links 
 History of Rome podcast: by Mike Duncan contextualizing and describing invasion plans.

Roman–Parthian Wars
1st century BC in the Roman Republic
1st century BC in Iran
Abandoned military projects
1st century BC
Julius Caesar